The Monte della Guardia is a mountain in Piedmont, northern Italy, part of the Alps.  At an altitude of 1,658 metres is one of the highest summits of the Ligurian Prealps.

Geography 

The mountain stands on the main chain of the Alps between Tanaro and Arroscia valleys. It belongs to the province of Cuneo, in Piedmont, and is located on the border between the municipalities of Ormea and Caprauna, not faraway from Liguria.

SOIUSA classification 
According to the SOIUSA (International Standardized Mountain Subdivision of the Alps) the mountain can be classified in the following way:
 main part = Western Alps
 major sector =  South Western Alps
 section = Ligurian Alps
 subsection = Prealpi Liguri
 supergroup = Catena Settepani-Carmo-Armetta
 group = Gruppo Galero-Armetta
 subgroup = Costiera Galero-Armetta
 code = I/A-1.I-A.3.a

Geology 

The area of Monte della Guardia is characterized by triassic limestone. Towards monte Armetta, on the slopes facing the Tanaro valley, stands a large cave known as Grotta dei Dighè or Garb del Dighea. It was surveyed at the end of the 19th century by entomologists that detected an interesting troglofauna with Plectogona sanfilippoi, subsp. Digheae, an arthropod endemic of Tanaro valley.

Environment 
The northern side of the mountain fells with overhanging cliffs towards the valley of Tanaro river, while its gentler southern slopes are mainly covered of woods.

Access to the summit 
The summit can be easily reached with a short diversion from the Alta Via dei Monti Liguri, a long-distance trail from Ventimiglia (province of Imperia) to Bolano (province of La Spezia) which flancks the mountain on its Ligurian Sea side. In wintertime the northern slopes of Monte della Guardia offer some interesting icefalls.

References

Mountains of the Ligurian Alps
Mountains of Piedmont
One-thousanders of Italy